"Sexy Señorita" is a song recorded by Serbian pop recording artist Milica Pavlović and served as the third single from her debut studio album Govor tela. It was released 15 June 2013. 

The song was first heard when Pavlović performed it on the television show Zvezde Granda. The music video was released 24 June 2013.

References

2013 singles
2013 songs
Grand Production singles